Barker Peak is a peak  west-northwest of Mount Terror on Ross Island. It was named in 2000 by the New Zealand Geographic Board after Major James R. M. Barker, officer in command at Scott Base, 1970–71, and a New Zealand Antarctic Programme manager, 1970–86.

References 

Mountains of Ross Island